William Wilson Hallman (March 31, 1867 – September 11, 1920) was an American professional baseball player. He played for six teams during his 14-year career, including one stint as a player-manager for the  St. Louis Browns.

Career
After spending two years with the Philadelphia Quakers, Hallman attempted to jump to the Philadelphia Athletics of the Players' League. When the Quakers sought a legal injunction against the move, the Philadelphia County Court of Common Pleas refused to enforce Hallman's contract with the Quakers. The court pointed out that the contract was so one-sided (allowing the team to dispense with Hallman for virtually any reason) that it was unenforceable.

In 1897, Hallman was a player-manager for the St. Louis Cardinals. Hallman was 13-46 as a manager; he served as the third of four managers in a disastrous 29-102 season.

Hallman owns one significant Major League recorded as the only player in history to improve his batting average in nine consecutive seasons, beginning at .206 in 1888 and ending at .320 in 1896.

Though a handful of players of Hallman's generation also made appearances in theater, most of them were brief parts with little dialogue. Author Jerrold Casway wrote that Hallman and Mike Donlin were the only two ballplayers who could have traded in their baseball careers for careers in theater.

Hallman last appeared in the major leagues in 1903, but he continued playing or managing in the Western League or South Atlantic League through 1909.

Hallman's nephew Bill played in the majors for four seasons as an outfielder.

Post-career
Hallman died at his Philadelphia home of heart disease after being sick for about four months. He was interred at the Holy Sepulchre Cemetery in Cheltenham, Pennsylvania.

See also

 List of Major League Baseball career stolen bases leaders
List of Major League Baseball player-managers

References

External links

See photos of Bill Hallman

1867 births
1920 deaths
19th-century baseball players
Baseball players from Pittsburgh
Burials at Holy Sepulchre Cemetery
Major League Baseball player-managers
Philadelphia Quakers players
Philadelphia Athletics (AA 1891) players
Philadelphia Phillies players
St. Louis Browns (NL) players
St. Louis Browns managers
Brooklyn Bridegrooms players
Cleveland Blues (1901) players
Minor league baseball managers
Wilkes-Barre (minor league baseball) players
Wilkes-Barre Coal Barons players
Milwaukee Brewers (minor league) players
Milwaukee Creams players
Buffalo Bisons (minor league) players
Denver Grizzlies (baseball) players
Savannah Pathfinders players
Baltimore Orioles (IL) players
Savannah Indians players
Albany Senators players
Columbia Gamecocks players
Philadelphia Athletics (PL) players